Legalism may refer to:

 Legalism (Chinese philosophy), Chinese political philosophy based on the idea that a highly efficient and powerful government is the key to social order
 Legalism (Western philosophy), a concept in Western jurisprudence
 Legalism (theology), a sometimes pejorative term relating to a number of concepts in the Christian theological tradition
Liberal legalism, a theory on the relationship between politics and law